Gharib Nawaz Mosque or Masjid Gharib Nawaz is a mosque in Mominpura, Nagpur. The mosque was named after Khwaja Moinuddin Chishti. The dome of the mosque is similar to the Shrine of Khwaja Gharib Nawaz.

Interior
The mosque architecture includes walls covered with marble, as well as twenty-seven arches. There are calligraphic verses derived from the Quran on every arch. The ornamentation on the walls includes the names of four khalifahs and Ahl Al Bait.

Visits
The leader of Dawat-e-Islami, Mohammad Ilyas Attar Qadri, visited in 1997. The Naat Khawan, Muhammad Owais Raza Qadri, visited the mosque in 1997. Mohammad Imran Attar visited the mosque in 2004. Sheikh Al Islam Madani Miyan, Sayyad Hashmi Miyan, and other Muslim scholars have visited as well.

Gallery

References

External links

Mosques in Nagpur
Barelvi mosques
Mosques completed in 1999
1999 establishments in Maharashtra